Steppin' Up is an album by saxophonist Hank Crawford and organist Jimmy McGriff recorded in 1987 and released on the Milestone label.

Reception 

Allmusic's Scott Yanow said: "the results are predictably soulful and pleasing... this is a highly enjoyable outing, easily recommended for soul-jazz fans".

Track listing
 "River's Invitation" (Percy Mayfield) – 8:37
 "The Real Deal" (Hank Crawford) – 9:08
 "Tippin' In" (Bobby Smith, Marty Symes) – 5:22
 "Vicki" (Jimmy McGriff) – 6:10
 "Be Anything (but Be Mine)" (Irving Gordon) – 6:34
 "Steppin' Up" (McGriff) – 3:20
 "Lift Every Voice and Sing" (John Rosamond Johnson, James Weldon Johnson) – 6:05
 "Something for Bubba" (Crawford, McGriff) – 7:10 Additional track on CD release

Personnel
Hank Crawford  – alto saxophone
Jimmy McGriff – organ
Jimmy Ponder – guitar
Billy Preston – piano (tracks 1 & 6-8)
Vance James − drums

References

 

Milestone Records albums
Hank Crawford albums
Jimmy McGriff albums
1987 albums
Albums produced by Bob Porter (record producer)
Albums recorded at Van Gelder Studio